Caucahue is an ethonym used by Chonos and the Huilliche and Spanish of Chiloé for a group of canoe-faring people that inhabited the archipelagoes south of the Gulf of Penas. The term is one of the various ethnonyms recorded by the Spanish in the 18th century in the fjords and chanels of Patagonia. The Caucahue spoke a language different from the one of the Chono. Archaeologist Ricardo Alvarez posits that the Caucahue and other groups appeared relatively late in colonial records when contact became more common. Alvarez also posits the Caucahue disappeared from the historical record by merging into the Kawésqar to the south and the people of Chiloé to the north. According to historian Ximena Urbina and co-workers the Caucahue are essentially ancient Kawésqar. "Caucahues" described in sources as "gigantic" may have been Tehuelches.

See also
Antonio de Vea expedition
Caucahue Island
Indigenous peoples in Chile

References

Ethnonyms 
History of Aysén Region
History of Magallanes Region
Kawésqar
Indigenous peoples of the Southern Cone
Ethnic groups in Chile
Indigenous peoples in Chile
Hunter-gatherers of South America
Nomadic groups in the Americas